Afridi or Apridi Pashto ( afrīdī/aprīdī/opride) is a Northern Karlani dialect of the Pashto language that is widespread among the representatives of the Afridis kin. The Afridi Pashto is a spoken language in the area of settlement of Afridis – the regions of Khyber and Kohat, Orakzai Agency, the cities of Zakka Khel, Jamrud, Darra Adam Khel  and the valley of Timrakh. The Afridi dialect has an 80–90% lexical intelligibility with other Northern dialects of Pashto, while the intelligibility with the dialects of the Southern Region is 75–80%.

Phonetics 

The phonetics of Afridi Pashto are similar to the phonetics of other Northern dialects of Pashto.

Footnotes

See also 
Pakistan
Afghanistan
Pashto language

Varieties of Pashto